Nella Maria Bonora (19 May 1904 – 3 August 1990) was an Italian actress of film, radio and stage. She also worked as a prominent voice actress, dubbing foreign films for release in the Italian market.

Selected filmography
 The Devil's Lantern (1931)
 The Old Lady (1932)
 The Last Adventure (1932)
 The Wedding March (1934)
 The Two Sergeants (1936)
 The Former Mattia Pascal (1937)
 The Two Misanthropists (1937)

References

Bibliography 
 Landy, Marcia. Fascism in Film: The Italian Commercial Cinema, 1931-1943. Princeton University Press, 2014.

External links 
 

1904 births
1990 deaths
Actors from Mantua
Italian film actresses
Italian stage actresses
Italian voice actresses